Barikeh-ye Sadeqi (also Romanized as Bārīkeh-ye Şādeqī; also known as Bārīkeh-ye Pā’īn, Bārīkeh-ye Şādeq, Bārīkeh-ye Soflá, Bārīkey-ye Şādeqī-ye Soflá, Qal‘a Shaikh Sadiq, and Sheykh Şādeq) is a village in Harasam Rural District, Homeyl District, Eslamabad-e Gharb County, Kermanshah Province, Iran. At the 2006 census, its population was 209, in 44 families.

References 

Populated places in Eslamabad-e Gharb County